Girls in Peacetime Want to Dance is the ninth studio album by Scottish indie pop band Belle and Sebastian, released on 19 January 2015. It was the first album by the group to be distributed by Matador Records worldwide. The album was recorded in Atlanta, Georgia, in 2014, and marked the first time the band worked with producer Ben H. Allen III. "The Party Line" was announced as the first single from the album on 29 October 2014, with its first airplay on BBC 6 Music.

The album reached number nine on the UK Albums Chart and number 28 on the US Billboard 200.

Reception

On review aggregator website Metacritic, the album has a weighted average score of 76 out of 100 based on reviews from 36 critics, indicating "generally favorable reviews". Highlighting the group's increased sense of rhythm and attention to dance music, Stephen Carlick of Exclaim! wrote that "Girls in Peacetime Want to Dance is a statement record that Belle and Sebastian are still expert songwriters, with more than a few musical cards left to play."

Track listing

4-LP box set track listing

Disc One: The Party Line

Disc Two: Enter Silvia Plath

Disc Three: Play for Today

Disc Four: Perfect Couples

Charts

References

2015 albums
Belle and Sebastian albums
Matador Records albums
Albums produced by Ben H. Allen